Wang Wei (699–759) was a Chinese musician, painter, poet, and politician of the middle Tang dynasty. He is regarded as one of the most famous men of arts and letters of his era.  Many of his poems survive and 29 of them are included in the 18th-century anthology Three Hundred Tang Poems. Many of his best poems were inspired by the local landscape.

Wang Wei is especially known as a poet and painter of nature. Some 400 poems survive. These were first collected and originally edited into a corpus by his next-youngest brother, Wang Jin, by imperial command. Of his paintings, no authenticated specimens survive, although there is evidence of his work through influences on later paintings and descriptive accounts of his paintings. His musical talents were regarded very highly, although nothing survives of his music except reports. He furthermore  had a successful career as a court official. Eventually, he became a devout Zen Buddhist and a vegetarian. Wang Wei spent ten years studying with Chán master Daoguang.

Names
His family name is Wang, and his given name is Wei. He chose the courtesy name Mojie, signing his works Wang Weimojie because Wei-mo-Jie was a reference to Vimalakirti, the central figure of the Buddhist sutra by that name. In this holy book of Buddhism, which is partly in the form of a debate with Mañjuśrī (the Bodhisattva of Wisdom), a lay person, Vimalakīrti, expounds the doctrine of Śūnyatā, or emptiness, to an assembly which includes arhats and bodhisattvas, and then culminates with the wordless teaching of silence.

Life

Early years
Born into an aristocratic family, of Han ethnicity, originally from Qixian (present-day Qi County in Shanxi province), Wang Wei's father moved east of the Yellow River to Puzhou, part of the historic Hedong Commandery (today's Yongji, Shanxi). Known for his youthful precocity, Wang Wei, the eldest of five brothers, set off for the imperial capital at the age of nineteen, in order to study and take the jinshi civil service entrance examination. In the period while residing in Chang'an, before taking the test, Wang's proficiency at poetry and his musical proficiency with the pipa helped him to achieve popularity at the royal court. He passed the jinshi examination, in 721, with the first class award (Zhuangyuan), which started his potentially lucrative civil service career. Wang Wei's career as an official had its ups and downs. His first appointment was as a court musician, or "Deputy Master of Music"; however, he was then demoted to a position of being in charge of a granary in the former province of Jizhou (now the name of a different town Jizhou, in Hebei). The reason for this demotion, according to tradition, was Wang's breach of etiquette by performing a lion dance.

In any case, this was only a minor setback to his career, and it had a compensation in that it did allow him to travel. Then, a series of promotions following this demotion was apparently attributable to a relationship with the prominent governmental minister, poet, and literary scholar Zhang Jiuling, at least until Zhang's 727 demotion to a post in Jingzhou. By 728, Wang Wei was back in Chang'an, where he entertained the poet Meng Haoran, who was to become a close friend and poetic colleague. At this point, Wang seems to have achieved the rank of Assistant Censor, and then a subsequent governmental promotion, but then later being demoted back to Assistant Censor, with the loss in imperial favor of Zhang Jiuling and the rising political ascendency of Li Linfu. After his wife's death in 731, he never remarried. It was in his role as a government official that Wang Wei was dispatched to Liangzhou, which was then the northwestern frontier of the Chinese empire, and the scene of constant military conflicts. By invitation of the local commander, Wang served in this location until returning to Chang'an in 738 or early 739.

Middle years
After returning to Chang'an from Liangzhou, and lacking an official posting, Wang Wei took the opportunity to explore the countryside south of the capital, in the Lantian area within the Zhongnan Mountains. There, Wang Wei made friends with Pei Di. In 740–741 Wang resumed his governmental career. This included an inspection tour of Xiangyang, Hubei (the home of Meng Haoran). Afterwards, Wang held various postings in Chang'an. Besides his governmental salary, he made money as an artist, thereby having the means to purchase the sizable Lantian estate, formerly owned by the poet Song Zhiwen, known as Wang Chuan. After his mother's death in 747–748, Wang Wei erected a shrine in her honor at the estate, spending a traditional three-year period in mourning. Wang Wei was so afflicted by grief that he was reduced almost to a skeleton. By 751–752 Wang Wei resumed his official duties. But, at this point, historical records are cloudy, the result of the devastating effects of the An Shi disorders.

War

The An-Shi rebellion (755 - 763), profoundly affected Chinese social culture in general and Wang Wei in particular. However, Nicolas Tackett has recently argued that it was not as destructive to the Tang aristocracy as had previously been thought. In 756, Wang Wei was residing in the capital of Chang'an, where he was captured by the rebels when they took the city. Although the emperor Xuanzong and his court and most of the governmental officials had already evacuated to Sichuan, Wang Wei had come down with dysentery and at that time was an invalid and thus unable to travel, especially not on this notoriously mountainous and difficult passage. The rebels then took their prize captive to their capital at Luoyang, where the government of the rebellion sought his collaboration. According to some sources, he attempted to avoid actively serving the insurgents during the capital's occupation by pretending to be deaf; other sources state that, in an attempt to destroy his voice, he drank medicine that created cankers on his mouth. In any case, at Luoyang, Wang Wei was unable to avoid becoming officially one of the rebels, with an official title. In 757, with the ascendency of Suzong, and the Tang recapture of Luoyang from the rebel forces, Wang Wei was arrested and imprisoned by the Tang government as a suspected traitor.

The charges of disloyalty were eventually dropped, partly because of the intervention of his brother, Wang Jin, who held high government rank (as Undersecretary of the Board of Punishments) and whose loyal efforts in the defense of Taiyuan were well known. Furthermore, the poems he had written during his captivity were produced, and accepted as evidence in favor of his loyalty. Following his pardon, Wang Wei spent much of his time in his Buddhist practice and activities. Then, with the further suppression of the rebellion, he again received a government position, in 758, at first in a lower position than prior to the rebellion, as a tàizǐ zhōngchōng, in the court of the crown prince rather than that of the emperor himself. In 759 Wang Wei was not only restored to his former position in the emperor's court, but he was eventually promoted. Over time, he was moved to the secretarial position of jǐshìzhōng and his last position, which he held until his death in 761, was shàngshū yòuchéng, or deputy prime minister. As these positions were in the city of Chang'an, they were not too far from his private estate to prevent him from visiting and repairing it. During all this time, he continued his artistic endeavors.

Later years

Wang Wei never lived to see the empire return to peace, as the An-Shi disturbances and their aftermath continued beyond his lifetime. However, at least he could enjoy a relative return to stability compared to the initial years of the rebellion, especially when he had the opportunity to spend time in the relative seclusion of his Lantian estate, which allowed him both a poetic and a Buddhist retreat, as well as a place to spend time with his friends and with nature, painting and writing. But, finally, his writing came to an end, and in the seventh month of 759, or in 761, Wang Wei requested writing implements, wrote several letters to his brother and to his friends, and then died. He was then buried at his Lantian estate.

Works

Wang Wei was famous for both his poetry and his paintings, about which Su Shi coined a phrase: "The quality of Wang Wei’s poems can be summed up as, 'a painting within a poem.'  Observing his paintings you see, 'within the painting there is poetry.'"  He is especially known for his compositions in the Mountains and Streams (Shanshui) poetry genre, the landscape school of poetry, along with Meng Haoran; their family names were combined in a form of mutual reference and they are commonly referred to as "Wang Meng" due to their excellence in poetic composition, as contemporaries. In his later years, Wang Wei lost interest in being a statesman and became more involved in Buddhism and his poems reflected his focus on Chan practice, therefore he was posthumously referred to as the "Poet Buddha".  His works are collected in Secretary General Wang's Anthology, which includes 400 poems.  He excelled in painting images of people, bamboo forests and scenery of mountains and rivers.  It is recorded that his landscape paintings have two different genres, one of the Father and Son of the Li Family and the other being of strong brush strokes. His work of Picture of Wang River is of the latter, but unfortunately the original no longer exists.  His works of Scenery of Snow and Creek and Jinan’s Fusheng Portrait are both realistic in their representation of the subjects.

At present 420 poems are attributed to Wang Wei, of which 370 are thought to be genuine. Wang Wei was a "very great master" of the jueju: many of his quatrains depict quiet scenes of water and mist, with few details and little human presence. The Indiana Companion comments that he affirms the world's beauty, while questioning its ultimate reality. It also draws a comparison between the deceptive simplicity of his works and the Chan path to enlightenment, which is built on careful preparation but is achieved without conscious effort.

One of Wang Wei's famous poems is "One-hearted" (Xiang Si ):

Wang River Collection

Some of Wang Wei's most famous poetry was done as a series of 20 quatrains written by him to which his friend Pei Di wrote replies. Together, these form a group titled the Wang River Collection. Note that "Wang" as in the river is a different character that the "Wang" of Wang Wei's name. It literally refers to the outside part of a wheel; and also that these are sometimes referred to as the "Lantian poems", after the real name of Wang's estate's location, in what is now Lantian County. 

Inspired in part by Wang's Lantian home and features of its neighborhood and by their correspondences with other places and features, the collection includes such pieces as the poem often translated "Deer Park" (literally, "Deer Fence"). However, the poems tend to have a deceptive simplicity to them, while they actually have great depth and complexity upon closer examination. Below is a selection of several of Wang's 20 "Wang River Collection" quatrains, with English translations by the American sinologist Stephen Owen.

Painting

Wang Wei has historically been regarded as the founder of the Southern School of Chinese landscape art, a school which was characterised by strong brushstrokes contrasted with light ink washes.

Cultural references

Influence in the East
Wang Wei was of extensive influence in China and its area of cultural influence, particularly in terms of monochrome ink painting and in terms of his deceptively simple and insightful Buddhist-influenced poetry. Wang Shimin and Wang Yuanqi of the Six Masters of the early Qing period painted works in the style of Wang Wei, as well as copying his paintings as "copying former masters was seen as the cornerstone of artistic training." In the Ming Dynasty, Dong Qichang included Wang Wei's style in his paintings after the old masters.

One of Wang Wei's poems, called Weicheng Qu or "Song of the City of Wei" has been adapted to the famous music melody, Yangguan Sandie or "Three Refrains on the Yang Pass". The most famous version of this melody is based on a tune for guqin first published in 1864 but may be traced back to a version from 1530.

Wang Wei's lasting influence is seen in the death poem of the Japanese haiku master Yosa Buson:

Influence in the West
 Wang Wei's poetry, in translation, formed the inspiration for the final Der Abschied movement of the Austrian composer Gustav Mahler's penultimate completed work, Das Lied von der Erde.  Der Abschied is set to a loose German translation of Wang Wei's Farewell, a work addressed to fellow poet Meng Haoran on the occasion of his retirement (after a brief civil service career) to become a scholar-recluse (yinshi).

 Wang Wei's poetry, found in the works of Ernest Fenollosa, also provided inspiration for the American poet Ezra Pound in the creation of Pound's Ideogrammic Method.
 His art inspired Innisfree Garden in Millbrook, New York.
 The Wang River Sequence has been set for choir by UK composer Peter McGarr in his piece 'Beautiful Days'.

See also

References

Citations

Sources 

 Bynner, Witter (1929), trans. (from the texts of Kiang Kang-hu). The Jade Mountain, a Chinese Anthology: Being Three Hundred Poems of the T'ang Dynasty. New York: Knopf.
 Chang, H.C. (1977), Chinese Literature 2: Nature Poetry. New York: Columbia University Press. .
 Chang, Yin-nan, and Lewis C. Walmsley (1958), trans. Poems by Wang Wei. Rutland, VT: Tuttle.
 Ch'en, Jerome and Michael Bullock (1960), Poems of Solitude. London: Abelard-Schuman. .
 Cheng, Francois (1977), L'Ecriture poétique chinoise.  Paris: Editions du Seuil. Trans. by Donald A. Riggs and Jerome P. Seaton as Chinese Poetic Writing: With an Anthology of T'ang Poetry Bloomington: Indiana University Press, 1982.
 Davis, A.R. (Albert Richard), Editor and Introduction (1970), The Penguin Book of Chinese Verse. Baltimore: Penguin Books.
 Ferguson, John C. (1927), Chinese Painting. Chicago: University of Chicago Press.
 Fletcher, W.J.B. (1919), trans. Gems of Chinese Verse, Translated into English Verse. Shanghai: Commercial Press.
 Giles, Herbert (1884), ed. and trans. Chinese Poetry in English Verse. Shanghai: Kelly & Walsh.
 Hinton, David (2008), Classical Chinese Poetry: An Anthology. New York: Farrar, Straus, and Giroux. .
 Kenner, Hugh (1971), The Pound Era. Berkeley: University of California Press.
 Mitchell, Donald (1985), Gustav Mahler: Songs and Symphonies of Life and Death. London: Faber and Faber.

 Robinson, G.W. (1974), Wang Wei Poems Penguin Classics, 
 Stimson, Hugh M. (1976), Fifty-five T'ang Poems. Far Eastern Publications: Yale University, New Haven, CN. 
 Wagner, Marsha (1982), Wang Wei. Boston: Twayne.
 Watson, Burton (1971), Chinese Lyricism: Shih Poetry from the Second to the Twelfth Century. New York: Columbia University Press. .
 Weinberger, Eliot, and Octavio Paz (1987), Nineteen Ways of Looking at Wang Wei: How a Chinese Poem Is Translated. Wakefield, RI: Moyer Bell.
 Wu, John C.H. (1972), The Four Seasons of Tang Poetry. Rutland, Vermont: Charles E. Tuttle. .
 Yip, Wai-lim (1972), trans. Hiding the Universe: Poems by Wang Wei. New York: Munshinsha/Grossman.
 Yip, Wai-lim (1993), Diffusion of Distances: Dialogues between Chinese and Western Poetics. Berkeley: University of California Press.
 Yu, Pauline (1980), The Poetry of Wang Wei: New Translations and Commentary. Bloomington: Indiana University Press.

Critical editions 
 Wang Youcheng Ji Jianzhu 《王右丞集箋注》 (An Annotated Edition of the Collected Works of Wang [Wei] the Right Assistant Secretary of State Affairs). Edited by Zhao Diancheng (趙殿成) (1683–1756). Shanghai: Shanghai Ancient Books Publishing House, 1961.

Further reading 
 Link, Perry, "A Magician of Chinese Poetry" (review of Eliot Weinberger, with an afterword by Octavio Paz), 19 Ways of Looking at Wang Wei (with More Ways), New Directions, 88 pp. and Eliot Weinberger, The Ghosts of Birds, New Directions, 211 pp. The New York Review of Books, vol. LXIII, no. 18 (November 24, 2016), pp. 49–50.
 Rouzer, Paul (2020). The Poetry and Prose of Wang . De Gruyter Mouton.

External links

 Complete translation of Wang Wei's poems, as well as selected prose works, by Paul Rouzer
 Wang Wei in English at Poems Found in Translation
 
 Regulated verses of Wang Wei, with English translation, pinyin transliteration, and tonal patterns.
 Translations by sixteen poets of "Deer Park"
 Landscapes Clear and Radiant: The Art of Wang Hui (1632–1717), an exhibition catalog from The Metropolitan Museum of Art (fully available online as PDF), which contains material on Wang Wei (see index)
 Complete works of Wang Wei, in Chinese, at 'The Poetry of Chinese Antiquity' website
 
Books of the Quan Tangshi that include collected poems of Wang Wei at the Chinese Text Project:
Book 125
Book 126
Book 127
Book 128

699 births
759 deaths
8th-century Chinese musicians
8th-century Chinese poets
8th-century Chinese painters
Buddhist artists
Chinese portrait painters
Musicians from Shanxi
Painters from Shanxi
Politicians from Yuncheng
Poets from Shanxi
Tang dynasty musicians
Tang dynasty painters
Tang dynasty poets
Tang dynasty politicians from Shanxi
Three Hundred Tang Poems poets